The 12th Alberta Legislative Assembly was in session from February 19, 1953, to May 12, 1955, with the membership of the assembly determined by the results of the 1952 Alberta general election held on August 5, 1952. The Legislature officially resumed on February 19, 1953, and continued until the third session was prorogued and dissolved on May 12, 1955, prior to the 1955 Alberta general election.

Alberta's twelfth government was controlled by the majority Social Credit Party for the fifth time, led by Premier Ernest Manning who would go on to be the longest serving Premier in Alberta history. The Official Opposition was led by James Harper Prowse a member of the Alberta Liberal Party. The Speaker was Peter Dawson who would serve until his death during the 15th legislature on March 24, 1963.

Composition at election

References

Further reading

External links
Alberta Legislative Assembly
Legislative Assembly of Alberta Members Book
By-elections 1905 to present

12